Oree Banks (born c. 1936) is a former American football player and coach. He served as the head football coach at South Carolina State University from 1965 to 1972 and at West Virginia State University from 1977 to 1983, compiling a career college football coaching record of 76–63–3. Banks was the first African American to be hired as a full-time assistant coach in the history of the University of South Carolina.

Head coaching record

College

s

References

Year of birth missing (living people)
1930s births
Living people
American football ends
Grambling State Tigers football coaches
Kansas State Wildcats football players
Marshall Thundering Herd football coaches
South Carolina Gamecocks football coaches
South Carolina State Bulldogs football coaches
Virginia Cavaliers football coaches
West Virginia State Yellow Jackets football coaches
Wisconsin Badgers football coaches
Junior college football coaches in the United States
People from Newton, Mississippi
African-American coaches of American football
African-American players of American football
21st-century African-American people
20th-century African-American sportspeople